Capital punishment in modern Greece was carried out using the guillotine (until 1913) or by firing squad. It was last applied in 1972 during the military junta, and the death penalty was abolished in stages between 1975 and 2005.

History
Executions during the Greek War of Independence were carried out by firing squad, although when the monarchy introduced the Penal Code in 1834, beheading by guillotine became the only mode of execution. In 1847, difficulties in making the guillotine available for every execution made the government establish the firing squad as an alternative mode of execution. Both would be used until the firing squad was established as the only means of execution in 1929 (the last execution by guillotine took place in 1913). Over 3,000 executions took place between 1946 and 1949 during the Greek Civil War. The last execution took place on 25 August 1972, when the 27-year-old Vassilis Lymberis was shot by firing squad for the murder of his wife, mother-in-law and two children (he burned them alive inside their house) on the island of Crete.

Capital punishment was abolished for peacetime crimes other than high treason during wartime by article 7 of the Constitution of 1975. Previously, the three leading members of the Greek junta, Georgios Papadopoulos, Stylianos Pattakos, and Nikolaos Makarezos were sentenced to death for mutiny during the Greek Junta Trials, but these sentences were commuted to life imprisonment by the Karamanlis government. 

In 1997 Greece ratified the Second Optional Protocol to the International Covenant on Civil and Political Rights, aiming at the abolition of the death penalty; however, a reservation was made allowing for death penalty use for the most serious crimes, i.e. high treason, committed during wartime. Protocol No. 6 to the European Convention on Human Rights (ECHR), providing for the abolition of the death penalty in peacetime, was ratified in 1998.

Greece abolished the death penalty for all crimes in 2004. In 2005, Greece ratified the Protocol No. 13 to the ECHR, concerning the abolition of the death penalty under all circumstances.

The Golden Dawn party called in 2013 for the restoration of the death penalty for immigrants convicted of violent crimes.

References

External links
 Second Optional Protocol to ICCPR; Protocol No. 6 and Protocol No. 13 to ECHR - text of the treaties, dates of signature and ratification
 Abolitionist and retentionist countries - report by Amnesty International

 

Penal system in Greece
Greece
Death in Greece
Human rights abuses in Greece
2004 disestablishments in Greece